Chah Sorkh or Chah-e Sorkh may refer to:
 Chah-e Sorkh, Arsanjan, Fars Province
 Chah Sorkh, Neyriz, Fars Province
 Chah Sorkh, Sarvestan, Fars Province
 Chah Sorkh, Shiraz, Fars Province
 Chah Sorkh, Hormozgan
 Chah Sorkh, Nir, Taft County, Yazd Province